The Battlefords North Stars are a Junior "A" ice hockey team based in North Battleford, Saskatchewan, Canada, that plays in the Saskatchewan Junior Hockey League.  The teams was founded in 1973 as the Battleford Barons and has been known as the North Stars since 1983. They won the SJHL Championship for the 2016-2017 season.

Season-by-season standings

Playoffs
1989 Lost Quarter-final
Nipawin Hawks defeated Battlefords North Stars 4-games-to-2
1990 Lost Quarter-final
Yorkton Terriers defeated Battlefords North Stars 4-games-to-1
1991 Lost Quarter-final
Humboldt Broncos defeated Battlefords North Stars 4-games-to-2
1992 DNQ
1993 DNQ
1994 Lost Quarter-final
Humboldt Broncos defeated Battlefords North Stars 4-games-to-3
1995 Lost Final
Battlefords North Stars defeated Kindersley Klippers 4-games-to-none
Battlefords North Stars defeated Melfort Mustangs 4-games-to-2
Weyburn Red Wings defeated Battlefords North Stars 4-games-to-1
1996 Lost Semi-final
Battlefords North Stars defeated Nipawin Hawks 4-games-to-2
Melfort Mustangs defeated Battlefords North Stars 4-games-to-1
1997 Lost Final
Battlefords North Stars defeated Melfort Mustangs 4-games-to-none
Battlefords North Stars defeated Nipawin Hawks 4-games-to-2
Weyburn Red Wings defeated Battlefords North Stars 4-games-to-none
1998 Lost Quarter-final
Battlefords North Stars defeated Humboldt Broncos 2-games-to-none
Nipawin Hawks defeated Battlefords North Stars 4-games-to-none
1999 Lost Quarter-final
Battleford North Stars defeated Flin Flon Bombers 2-games-to-none
Melfort Mustangs defeated Battlefords North Stars 4-games-to-2
2000 Won League, Won Anavet Cup, Lost Royal Bank Cup Semi-final - Won Bronze
First in round robin (3-1) vs. Flin Flon Bombers and Melfort Mustangs
Battlefords North Stars defeated Kindersley Klippers 4-games-to-1
Battlefords North Stars defeated Humboldt Broncos 4-games-to-3
Battlefords North Stars defeated Weyburn Red Wings 4-games-to-3 SJHL CHAMPIONS
Battlefords North Stars defeated OCN Blizzard (MJHL) 4-games-to-1 ANAVET CUP CHAMPIONS
Fourth in 2000 Royal Bank Cup round robin (2-2)
Fort McMurray Oil Barons (BCHL) defeated Battlefords North Stars 5-2 in Semi-final
Battlefords North Stars defeated Chilliwack Chiefs (BCHL) 3-2 2OT in Bronze Medal Game
2001 DNQ
2002 Lost Quarter-final
Kindersley Klippers defeated Battlefords North Stars 4-games-to-3
2003 Lost Semi-final
Battlefords North Stars defeated Kindersley Klippers 4-games-to-none
Humboldt Broncos defeated Battlefords North Stars 4-games-to-2
2004 Lost Quarter-final
Kindersley Klippers defeated Battlefords North Stars 4-games-to-none
2005 Lost Final
Battlefords North Stars defeated Kindersley Klippers 4-games-to-none
Battlefords North Stars defeated La Ronge Ice Wolves 4-games-to-3
Yorkton Terriers defeated Battlefords North Stars 4-games-to-3
2006 Lost Final
First in round robin (2-1-1) vs. Nipawin Hawks and La Ronge Ice Wolves
Battlefords North Stars defeated Flin Flon Bombers 4-games-to-1
Battlefords North Stars defeated La Ronge Ice Wolves 4-games-to-none
Yorkton Terriers defeated Battlefords North Stars 4-games-to-1
2007 Lost Quarter-final
Second in round robin (2-1-1) vs. Humboldt Broncos and Melfort Mustangs
Nipawin Hawks defeated Battlefords North Stars 4-games-to-2
2008 DNQ
2009 Lost Quarter-final
Battlefords North Stars defeated Nipawin Hawks 3-games-to-none
Humboldt Broncos defeated Battlefords North Stars 4-games-to-2
2010 Lost Semi-final
Battlefords North Stars defeated Melfort Mustangs 4-games-to-1
La Ronge Ice Wolves defeated Battlefords North Stars 4-games-to-2
2011 Lost Preliminary
Flin Flon Bombers defeated Battlefords North Stars 3-games-to-1

Western Canada Cup
Western Canada Championships ** BCHL - AJHL- SJHL - MJHL - Host  **
Round robin play with 1st vs 2nd - winner advance to National Championship & loser to Runner Up Game3rd vs 4th in 2nd semi-final winner to Runner Up game loser eliminated. Runner Up game determines 2nd representative to National Championship.Competition began 2013 season. Ended following 2017 playoffs.

NHL alumni
 Blair Atcheynum - Ottawa Senators, St. Louis Blues, Nashville Predators, Chicago Blackhawks
 Wade Belak - Colorado Avalanche, Calgary Flames, Toronto Maple Leafs, Florida Panthers, Nashville Predators
 Steve Konowalchuk - Washington Capitals, Colorado Avalanche
 Joel Kwiatkowski - Ottawa Senators, Washington Capitals, Florida Panthers, Pittsburgh Penguins, Atlanta Thrashers
 Jaroslav Obsut - St. Louis Blues, Colorado Avalanche
 Corey Schwab - New Jersey Devils, Tampa Bay Lightning, Vancouver Canucks, Toronto Maple Leafs
 Mick Vukota - New York Islanders, Tampa Bay Lightning, Montreal Canadiens

See also 
 List of ice hockey teams in Saskatchewan

External links 
 Battlefords North Stars official website

Saskatchewan Junior Hockey League teams
North Battleford
1973 establishments in Saskatchewan
Ice hockey clubs established in 1973